Tantalum telluride (TaTe2) is a chemical compound of tantalum and tellurium. Tantalum also forms a tantalum rich telluride with the approximate formula Ta1.6Te that is unusual in that it forms dodecagonal chalcogenide quasicrystals, a formation that cannot occur in a normal crystal because it does not result in a periodic crystal lattice.

External links
 Chemical properties on WebElements
 Tantalum Telluride Quasicrystals at ETH Microscopy

Tellurides
Tantalum compounds